John Edwin Britton (August 6, 1924 – October 16, 2020) was a Canadian businessman and politician in Saskatchewan. He represented Wilkie from 1986 to 1995 in the Legislative Assembly of Saskatchewan as a Progressive Conservative.

He was born in Unity, Saskatchewan in August 1924, the son of Thomas Martin Britton. In 1944, Britton married Amy Isabelle McLaren. Before entering provincial politics, he was a bulk fuel oil dealer.

Britton died in October 2020 at the age of 96.

References

1924 births
2020 deaths
People from Unity, Saskatchewan
Progressive Conservative Party of Saskatchewan MLAs